Richard Edmund Pates (born February 12, 1943) is an American prelate of the Roman Catholic Church.  Pates served as bishop of the Diocese of Des Moines in Iowa from 2008 to 2019 and as an auxiliary bishop of the Archdiocese of St. Paul and Minneapolis in Minnesota from 2000 to 2008.

After his retirement, Pates served as apostolic administrator of both the Diocese of Joliet in Illinois and the Diocese of Crookston in Minnesota for short terms.

Biography

Early life
The youngest of three sons, Richard Pates was born on February 12, 1943, to Donald and Lenora Pates in Saint Paul, Minnesota. He attended Nazareth Hall Preparatory Seminary in Saint Paul and St. Paul Seminary, where he earned Bachelor of Philosophy and Bachelor of Latin degrees in 1965. Pates completed his graduate studies in Rome, where he resided at the Pontifical North American College.  He received a Licentiate of Sacred Theology from the Pontifical Gregorian University.

Early priesthood
On December 20, 1968, Pates was ordained to the priesthood for the Archdiocese of St. Paul and Minneapolis by Bishop Francis Reh at St. Peter's Basilica in Rome.  After returning to Minnesota in 1968, he was appointed associate pastor at Blessed Sacrament Parish in St. Paul. In 1970, he was named vocation director of the archdiocese holding that position until 1974.  Pates also served as a weekend associate pastor at Annunciation Parish in Minneapolis. In 1973, he was named as private secretary to Archbishop Leo Byrne and vice-chancellor of the Archdiocese.

Senior priestly postings

In 1975, Pates was appointed as secretary of the apostolic delegation to the United States in Washington, D.C.. During this time, he assisted at Blessed Sacrament Parish in Chevy Chase, Maryland, and was raised by the Vatican to the rank of chaplain to his holiness in 1979.

In 1981, Pates returned to Saint Paul to become rector of Saint John Vianney College Seminary, a position he would hold until 1987.  He was also appointed chaplain of the Serra Club of Midway, Minnesota.  In 1987, Pates was appointed vicar for seminaries and pastor of Saint Kevin Parish and the Resurrection Parish, both in Minneapolis. In 1991, the two parishes merged to form Our Lady of Peace Parish , where Pates continued as pastor until 1998.

Pates served as moderator for the archdiocese deaneries, the Council of Catholic Women (1990–1998) and was the founding pastor of Saint Ambrose of Woodbury Parish in St. Paul (1998–2001).

Auxiliary Bishop of St. Paul and Minneapolis

On December 22, 2000, Pope John Paul II appointed Pates as an auxiliary bishop of the Diocese of St. Paul and Minneapolis and titular tishop of Suacia. He was consecrated on March 26, 2001, by Archbishop Harry Flynn, with Archbishop John Roach and Bishop Frederick Campbell serving as co-consecrators, at the Cathedral of St. Paul. As an auxiliary bishop, Pates served as vicar general, vicar for clergy, vicar for youth and young adults, and vicar for evangelization.

Bishop of Des Moines

On April 10, 2008, Pope Benedict XVI appointed Pates as the ninth bishop of the Diocese of Des Moines. He was installed on May 29, 2008.  Pates was the third consecutive Twin Cities' auxiliary bishop to be named bishop Des Moines; his two immediate predecessors, Bishop Joseph Charron and Bishop William Bullock, previously served the St. Paul and Minneapolis Archdiocese.

On November 14, 2011, Pates was elected chair of the United States Conference of Catholic Bishops' (USCCB) Committee on International Justice and Peace at the 2011 meeting, on a 122–114 vote over Bishop Frank Dewane of Venice, Florida. Pates advocated lifting the embargo and the other restrictions the US placed on Cuba, and for further dialogue between the two countries, earning some support from Florida-area Catholics.

Retirement 
On February 16, 2018, Pates submitted his letter of resignation as bishop of the Diocese of Des Moines to Pope Francis having reached the canonical retirement age of 75. His successor, then Father William M. Joensen, was announced in late July 2019.

Apostolic administrator

On December 27, 2019, Francis named Pates as apostolic administrator of the Diocese of Joliet after Bishop R. Daniel Conlon took medical leave. He continued in that role when Conlon retired on May 4, 2020. His responsibilities in Joliet ended when new Bishop Ronald Hicks was installed in Joliet on September 29, 2020.

On April 13, 2021, Francis named Pates as apostolic administrator of the Diocese of Crookston. The Pope had asked Bishop Michael Hoeppner to resign due to his mishandling of sexual abuse allegations against priests.  Pates' term ended on December 6, 2021, with the installation of new Bishop Andrew H. Cozzens as Bishop of Crookston.

References

External links

1943 births
Living people
Clergy from Saint Paul, Minnesota
21st-century Roman Catholic bishops in the United States
Saint Paul Seminary School of Divinity alumni
Pontifical Gregorian University alumni
Roman Catholic Archdiocese of Saint Paul and Minneapolis
Roman Catholic bishops of Des Moines
Religious leaders from Minnesota